Masur can mean:

Masurians or Masurs, a small European ethnic group
Masur (surname)
Masur, India, a town in Maharashtra state
Masur, Iran, a village in Lorestan Province
Masur, Yemen
Masur (lentil)
Masur-e Abi also known as  Māsūr

See also
 
Mazur (disambiguation)